Anđelija Stojanović (born 12 November 1987) is a Serbian chess player who holds the FIDE titles of Woman Grandmaster (WGM, 2007) and FIDE Trainer (2015). She is a three-time Serbian Women's Chess Champion (2007, 2008, 2010).

Biography
Anđelija Stojanović is a multiple medalist of the Serbian Women's Chess Championships, in which she won three gold (2007, 2008, 2010) and two silver (2011, 2012) medals.

Anđelija Stojanović played for Serbia in the Women's Chess Olympiads:
 In 2008, at third board in the 38th Chess Olympiad (women) in Dresden (+4, =7, -0),
 In 2010, at third board in the 39th Chess Olympiad (women) in Khanty-Mansiysk (+6, =3, -2),
 In 2012, at third board in the 40th Chess Olympiad (women) in Istanbul (+4, =4, -2),
 In 2014, at third board in the 41st Chess Olympiad (women) in Tromsø (+3, =3, -4).

Anđelija Stojanović played for Serbia in the European Women's Team Chess Championships:
 In 2007, at fourth board in the 7th European Team Chess Championship (women) in Heraklion (+4, =2, -2),
 In 2009, at third board in the 8th European Team Chess Championship (women) in Novi Sad (+3, =2, -2),
 In 2011, at third board in the 9th European Team Chess Championship (women) in Porto Carras (+3, =3, -1),
 In 2013, at fourth board in the 10th European Team Chess Championship (women) in Warsaw (+1, =4, -1),
 In 2015, at first board in the 11th European Team Chess Championship (women) in Reykjavik (+1, =3, -3).

Anđelija Stojanović played for Yugoslavia in the European Girls' U18 Team Chess Championships:
 In 2000, at second board in the 1st European U18 Team Chess Championship (girls) in Balatonlelle (+0, =1, -2),
 In 2003, at second board in the 4th European U18 Team Chess Championship (girls) in Balatonlelle (+1, =2, -1) and won team silver medal,
 In 2004, at second board in the 5th European U18 Team Chess Championship (girls) in Belgrade (+3, =0, -1) and won team gold and individual bronze medals.

In 2006, Anđelija Stojanović was awarded the FIDE Woman International Master (WIM) title and in 2007 she received the title of FIDE Woman Grandmaster (WGM). In 2015, she became a FIDE Trainer.

References

External links
 
 
 
 
 

1987 births
Living people
Serbian female chess players
Yugoslav female chess players
Chess woman grandmasters
Chess Olympiad competitors
Competitors at the 2013 Summer Universiade
Sportspeople from Belgrade